All American is an American sports drama television series which premiered on The CW on October 10, 2018. The series is inspired by the life of professional American football player Spencer Paysinger. On February 3, 2021, The CW renewed the series for a fourth season which premiered on October 25, 2021. On March 22, 2022, The CW renewed the series for a fifth season which premiered on October 10, 2022. On January 11, 2023, The CW renewed the series for a sixth season.

Series overview

Episodes

Season 1 (2018–19)

Season 2 (2019–20)

Season 3 (2021)

Season 4 (2021–22)

Season 5 (2022–23)

Ratings

Season 1

Season 2

Season 3

Season 4

Season 5

References 

Lists of American drama television series episodes
Lists of American LGBT-related television series episodes